The Shadow Exchequer Secretary to the Treasury is a member of the Official Opposition frontbench in the United Kingdom. The officeholder shadows the Exchequer Secretary to the Treasury. The current officeholder is Labour MP Abena Oppong-Asare shadowing James Cartlidge on the Treasury bench.

List

References 

Official Opposition (United Kingdom)